Nymphula grisealis is a moth in the family Crambidae. It was described by George Hampson in 1912. It is found in Sri Lanka.

References

Acentropinae
Moths described in 1912